David Stewart McKay (September 25, 1936 – February 20, 2013) was Chief Scientist for astrobiology at the Johnson Space Center. During the Apollo program, McKay provided geology training to the first men to walk on the Moon in the late 1960s. McKay was the first author of a scientific paper postulating past life on Mars on the basis of evidence in Martian meteorite ALH 84001, which had been found in Antarctica. This paper has become one of the most heavily cited papers in planetary science. The NASA Astrobiology Institute was founded partially as a result of community interest in this paper and related topics. He was a native of Titusville, Pennsylvania.

Apollo program
As a graduate student in geology at Rice University, McKay was present at John F. Kennedy's speech in 1962 announcing the goal of landing a man on the Moon within the decade. Inspired by Kennedy's speech, McKay as a NASA scientist trained the Apollo astronauts in geology. He was a chief trainer for Neil Armstrong and Buzz Aldrin during their last geology field trip in West Texas. On July 20, 1969 in Houston, McKay was the only geologist present in the Apollo Mission Control Room when Armstrong and Aldrin walked on the Moon, serving as a resource. He was named principal investigator to study the samples which they brought back from the Moon.

Lunar dust
McKay studied lunar dust since the return of the first Apollo 11 samples in 1969, and contributed over 200 publications on this topic. As a result of this effort, McKay contributed to major discoveries, including:

Source of vapor deposition on lunar soil grains
Formation of nano-phase iron globules on lunar soil grains
Processes on the Moon that contribute to grain size distribution
Space weathering and chemically activated nature of in-situ lunar dust.

Space resources and planetary materials
McKay published numerous papers and abstracts relating to planetary materials and space resource utilization: lunar regolith, cosmic dust, meteorites, Martian soil analogs, and technologies for producing oxygen, water, and building materials from lunar soil.

Lunar simulants
The engineering simulant JSC-1 was developed by McKay, James Carter of The University of Texas at Dallas, and others.

Martian microfossils
McKay's team published their findings in 1996 regarding possible microfossil structures in Martian meteorite ALH 84001.  McKay presented more than 100 talks at scientific and public gatherings on the possibility of life on Mars and the implications of that possibility.

Contributions to medical science
McKay's research group conducted studies of nanobacteria, tiny life forms such as might be found in extraterrestrial environments.  McKay's group was also part of a pioneering study on the effects of lunar dust on health.  Using one of the largest returned Apollo regolith samples released to scientists, the research team separated and studied the tiniest sized lunar dust particles.

Asteroid 6111 Davemckay
McKay was honored by the International Astronomical Union (IAU) by having asteroid 6111 Davemckay named for him in 2002. His IAU citation mentions his years of work on lunar samples as well as the positive effect his research on Martian meteorites has had on planetary research.

"It was an unexpected but very high honor to have an asteroid named after me”, McKay said. "If it ever crashes into Earth, I will probably get the blame, but in the meantime it is very nice to have it out there orbiting the Sun for perhaps the next few billion years."

Education
Rice University, B.A., Geology, 1958
University of California – Berkeley, M.A., Geology, 1960
Rice University, Ph.D., Geology, 1964

Professional positions

1996–2013: Chief scientist for Astrobiology and Planetary Science and Exploration
NASA Johnson Space Center, Houston, Texas 77058
Assistant for Exploration and Technology – NASA Johnson Space Center, 1994–96
Chief, Planetary Programs Office – NASA Johnson Space Center, 1991–94
Chief, Mission Science and Technology Office – NASA Johnson Space Center, 1990–91
Chief, Space Resources Utilization Office – NASA Johnson Space Center, 1987–90
Staff Scientist – NASA Johnson Space Center, 1965–87
Exploration geophysicist, Exxon and Marine Geophysical, 1960–61

Honors
Outstanding Graduate Student Award, Rice University Geology Department, 1963
Certificate of Special Commendation for Astronaut Training in Geology, Geological Society of America, 1973
NASA Superior Achievement Award for Lunar Science Contributions, JSC, 1973
Visiting Scientist Fellowship, Government of Japan, 1974–75
NASA Principal Investigator Recognition Award, 1979
Multiple Outstanding Performance and Sustained Superior Performance Awards by NASA
Eight Group Achievement Awards: Field Geology Training Team, Lunar Science Team, Lunar Landing Team, Lunar Surface Experiments Team, First Lunar Outpost Team, Orbital Debris Team, Planetary Materials Curation Team, and Mars Life Public Affairs Team
Laurels Award, 1996, by Aviation Week and Space Technology
Life on Mars Team awarded Rotary National Stellar Award for Space Achievement
Life on Mars Team awarded Popular Science Magazine Award: The Best of What's New: Grand Award Winner
NASA Exceptional Scientific Achievement Medal (NASA's highest award for science), July 1997
Distinguished Texas Scientist Award, 2000, The Texas Academy of Science

Personal
McKay's future wife, Mary Fae, was also in the audience at Rice Stadium during President Kennedy's pivotal speech, although McKay had not met her at that time. She went on to become a NASA technical editor.

McKay died in Houston, Texas, of heart disease.

See also
Christopher McKay – a NASA astrobiologist.

References

Further reading
Sawyer, Kathy (2006): The Rock from Mars: A Detective Story on Two Planets, Random House. 

1936 births
2013 deaths
American biochemists
American geologists
Rice University alumni
University of California, Berkeley alumni
NASA people
Astrobiologists
Meteorite researchers